Margaret "Boots" Wall was an actress on stage and screen. She appeared in silent films from the U.S. She was married to actor David V. Wall and had lead roles in films. She was a prominent player in All-Celtic Comedies.

Filmography
Tess of the d'Urbervilles (1913), as Reta
Caprice (1913), as Edith Henderson
Eph's Dream (1913)
Uncle Tom's Cabin (1914), as Topsy Goble
Always in the Way (1915)
Under Southern Skies (1915) as Margaret Wall

References

American stage actors
American film actresses
Year of birth missing
Year of death missing